Freeman, free men, or variant, may refer to:
 a member of the Third Estate in  medieval society (commoners), see estates of the realm
 Freeman, an apprentice who has been granted freedom of the company, was a rank within Livery companies
 Freeman, in Middle English synonymous with franklin (class), initially a person not tied to land as a villein or serf, later a land-owner
 Freeman (Colonial), in U.S. colonial times, a person not under legal restraint
 A person who has been awarded Freedom of the City
 Free tenant, a social class in the Middle Ages
 Freedman, a former slave that had been freed from bondage

Places
In the United States
 Freeman, Georgia, an unincorporated community
 Freeman, Illinois, an unincorporated community
 Freeman, Indiana, an unincorporated community
 Freeman, South Dakota, a city
 Freeman, Virginia, an unincorporated community
 Freeman, Wisconsin, a town in Crawford County
 Freeman, Langlade County, Wisconsin, an unincorporated community
 Freeman Island, an island in the state of Washington
 Freeman Peak, a mountain in Idaho
 Freeman Spur, Illinois, a village
 Freeman Township, Michigan
 Freeman, Washington
 Freeman Township, Freeborn County, Minnesota

In Norway
 Freeman Strait (Freemansundet), a body of water

Organizations
 City of London Freemen's School, a school in London
 Freeman High School (disambiguation)
 Freeman Academy, a school in South Dakota
 Freemen on the land, a self-styled modern movement, or collection of organizations, asserting that law must be contracted with individuals to be valid
 Montana Freemen, a self-styled Christian patriot group in Montana 
 W. H. Freeman and Company, publishers

History
 Battle of Freeman's Farm, an American Revolutionary War battle

People
 Freeman (rapper), French-Algerian rapper and dancer
 Freeman (singer) (born 1951), Finnish musician
 Freeman (surname), includes a list of people with surname Freeman
 Freeman (given name), includes a list of people with given name Freeman

Fictional Characters
 Freeman (Fatal Fury), a character in the Garou: Mark of the Wolves video game
 Fremen, a people in the Dune series

Media
 FreeMan, a Francis Magalona album
 Freeman (Labyrinth album), a Labyrinth album
 Freeman (Freeman album)
 The Freed Man, 1989 album by Sebadoh
 Freeman's Journal, a newspaper in Ireland
 The Freeman's Journal (Sydney), a newspaper in Australia
 The Freeman, a publication of the Foundation for Economic Education
 The Freeman (newspaper), a newspaper in Cebu City, Philippines
 Free Men (film), a 2011 French film
 Indianapolis Freeman, a newspaper published in Indianapolis, Indiana, United States in the late 19th century
 "Free Men" a science fiction short story by Robert A. Heinlein

Other
 Freeman (band), an American rock band centered on Aaron Freeman
 Freeman–Sheldon syndrome, a congenital disease
 NOAAS Miller Freeman (R 223), a National Oceanic and Atmospheric Administration fisheries and oceanographic research ship in commission from 1974 to 2013

See also
 Freman (disambiguation)
 Free (disambiguation)
 Freed (disambiguation)
 Justice Freeman (disambiguation)